The 2013–14 Big South Conference men's basketball season began on November 8, 2013, and concluded in March with the 2014 Big South Conference men's basketball tournament played at the HTC Center in Conway, South Carolina.

It was the Big South's 29th season of men's basketball, and the final year for one member, the VMI Keydets, who leave for the Southern Conference beginning in 2014–15. It was also the second year in which the conference utilized a six-team division format.

Awards and honors
 Player of the Year:  John Brown, High Point
 Freshman of the Year: Andrew Rowsey, UNC Asheville
 Defense Player of the Year: D. J. Covington, VMI
 Coach of the Year: Scott Cherry, High Point
 Scholar-Athlete of the Year: Mike Byron, Gardner–Webb

All–Big South Teams

First Team

Second Team

Honorable Mention

All-Freshman

All-Academic

NABC All–District Team
District 20 First Team
 John Brown, High Point
 D. J. Covington, VMI
District 20 Second Team
 Rodney Glasgow, VMI
 Andrew Rowsey, UNC Asheville

Conference Schedules

Conference matrix
This table summarizes the head-to-head results between teams in conference play. Teams play each team in their division twice and play teams out of their division once, totaling 16 games.

Campbell

|-
!colspan=9 style="background:#FF7F00; color:#000000;"| Big South Regular season

|-
!colspan=9 style="background:#FF7F00; color:#000000;"| 2014 Big South tournament

Charleston Southern

|-
!colspan=9 style="background:#002649; color:#C5B35B;"| Big South Regular season

|-
!colspan=9 style="background:#002649; color:#C5B35B;"| 2014 Big South tournament

Coastal Carolina

|-
!colspan=9 style="background:#008080; color:#A67D3D;"| Big South Regular season

|-
!colspan=9 style="background:#008080; color:#A67D3D;"| Big South tournament

|-
!colspan=9 style="background:#008080; color:#A67D3D;"| NCAA tournament

Gardner–Webb

|-
!colspan=9 style="background:#9C0606; color:#000000;"| Big South Regular season

|-
!colspan=9 style="background:#9C0606; color:#000000;"| 2014 Big South tournament

High Point

|-
!colspan=9 style="background:#4F007D; color:#ffffff;"| Big South Regular Season

|-
!colspan=9 style="background:#4F007D; color:#ffffff;"| Big South tournament

Liberty

|-
!colspan=9 style="background:#00009C; color:#FF0000;"| Big South Regular season

 

|-
!colspan=9 style="background:#00009C; color:#FF0000;"| 2014 Big South tournament

Longwood

|-
!colspan=9 style="background:#00285C; color:#827263;"| Big South Regular season

|-
!colspan=9 !colspan=9 style="background:#00285C; color:#827263;"| 2014 Big South tournament

|-

Presbyterian

|-
!colspan=9 style="background:#0060AA; color:#A80436;"| Big South Regular season

|-
!colspan=9 style="background:#0060AA; color:#A80436;"| 2014 Big South tournament

Radford

|-
!colspan=9 style="background:#ff0000; color:#ffffff;"| Big South Regular season

|-
!colspan=9 style="background:#ff0000; color:#ffffff;"| Big South tournament

UNC Asheville

|-
!colspan=9 style="background:#00438C; color:#FFFFFF;"| Big South Regular season

|-
!colspan=9 style="background:#00438C; color:#FFFFFF;"| Big South tournament

VMI

|-
!colspan=9 style="background:#FF0000; color:#FFFF00;"| Big South Regular season

|-
!colspan=9 style="background:#FF0000; color:#FFFF00;"| Big South tournament

Winthrop

|-
!colspan=9 style="background:#8C2633; color:#FFD700;"| Big South Regular season

|-
!colspan=9 style="background:#8C2633; color:#FFD700;"| 2014 Big South tournament

Postseason

Big South tournament

Bracket

NCAA tournament

National Invitation tournament

College Basketball Invitational

CollegeInsider.com tournament

Head coaches

Kevin McGeehan, Campbell
Barclay Radebaugh, Charleston Southern
Cliff Ellis, Coastal Carolina
Tim Craft, Gardner–Webb
Scott Cherry, High Point
Dale Layer, Liberty

Jasyon Gee, Longwood
Gregg Nibert, Presbyterian
Mike Jones, Radford
Nick McDevitt, UNC Asheville
Duggar Baucom, VMI
Pat Kelsey, Winthrop

References